Salvador Rico Barros (February 21, 1910 – May 24, 1940) was a Filipino poet and fictionist. He used the pen name Rodavlas. Barros wrote about 50 poems and 40 short stories in his lifetime. He won a gold medal award for best author in 1937. He died in 1940.

Published works 
 (Ten Poems)
 Mga Tinig ng Puso (Sonnets, Voices from the Heart)

References 

1910 births
1940 deaths
Filipino civil servants
20th-century Filipino poets
University of Manila alumni
Writers from Quezon
Filipino male poets
20th-century male writers